Nicholas Milliken is a Canadian politician who was elected in the 2019 Alberta general election to represent the electoral district of Calgary-Currie in the 30th Alberta Legislature. Milliken defeated incumbent Brian Malkinson by a margin of less than 1% (191 votes).

Milliken was elected Deputy Chair of Committees in the Alberta Legislature on May 21, 2019.

In July 2020 Milliken came under fire for, while sitting as Speaker, ejecting NDP member Marie Renaud out of the chamber during debate. Renaud noted that UCP members were bullying her while she was standing to speak to a bill. When Renaud refused to apologize for her comments, she was ejected. Milliken's impartiality was called into question since he focused the conflict on Renaud while failing to address the UCP members' behaviour.

On June 21, 2022, Premier Jason Kenney appointed Milliken as Alberta's Minister of Infrastructure. He was later appointed to Premier Danielle Smith's first cabinet as Minister of Mental Health and Addiction, the first to lead a full Ministry of Mental Health and Addiction. Prior to Milliken's appointment, this position was held by Associate Ministers.

In the Media 
On Sunday January 8, 2023 Milliken posted a tweet from a British tabloid paper that was widely considered to be problematic and reflected a "bias against these individuals and a complete misunderstanding around the nature of addiction and homelessness". He took it down but when challenged on it reposted it with the headline highlighted before taking it down a second time.  In a CTV article Lorian Hardcastle, a University of Calgary associate law professor specializing in health policy, characterized the tweet by the minister's account as "highly problematic," suggesting a potential misunderstanding of addiction and homelessness.

References

United Conservative Party MLAs
Living people
21st-century Canadian politicians
Politicians from Calgary
Year of birth missing (living people)